Wilmadilis Blasini Pérez (born March 4, 1982 in Ponce), best known as Uma Blasini,  is a Puerto Rican beauty pageant titleholder who represented Puerto Rico at the Miss Universe 2007 beauty pageant.

Early years
Blasini was born March 4, 1982, in Ponce, Puerto Rico, and raised in Guayanilla.

Career
A thyroid cancer survivor, Blasini competed in the Miss Puerto Rico Universe pageant in 2005, representing San Juan, and reached the 4th Runner-up position. Two years later, she went on to compete at the Miss Puerto Rico Universe pageant yet again, representing her home town Guayanilla. This time she won the crown and became the new Miss Puerto Rico Universe 2007. She was crowned by Zuleyka Rivera, who held the Miss Puerto Rico Universe 2006 title before she was crowned Miss Universe 2006.

Uma then travelled to Mexico to compete at Miss Universe 2007. She was unplaced at the pageant, which was won by Riyo Mori, Miss Japan.

She also represented Puerto Rico at Miss Continente Americano 2007 in Ecuador, where she placed in the Top 6, and at the Miss Tourism Queen International 2007 in China where she won the Best Long Gown Award.

Tallest
Blasini holds the record for the tallest Miss Puerto Rico at 6 ft 2 in (1.88 m).

Personal life
In 2012, Blasini married long time boyfriend Abel Misla. In that same year they had their first child, Fabian Esteban.

Photofake of Maria Putina

British newspaper Daily Mirror published a controversial article by PHIL BOOTH  named "Maria Putin: Everything you need to know about Vladimir Putin's daughter as she flees Dutch home" (dated 25 July 2014) about the oldest daughter of Vladimir Putin and her secret life in the Netherlands. The on-line version of that article can be found here: https://www.mirror.co.uk/news/world-news/maria-putin-everything-you-need-3912791 
The article made quite a sensation and news-storm in Russian mass-media  but no legal claim from Russian Federation to the newspaper was made. The first photo in the article pretending to represent Maria Putina (http://i1.mirror.co.uk/incoming/article3913555.ece/ALTERNATES/s615/PAY-Maria-Putin.jpg) but it is Uma Blasini. She didn't made any legal action against newspaper either. Daily Mirror or\and the author never tried to give any excuses for the use of Uma Blasini photo (or the next photos which shows Darja Zakharova together with Putin and his wife during 2008 election in Moscow ).

References

1982 births
Living people
People from Ponce, Puerto Rico
Puerto Rican female models
Miss Puerto Rico winners
Miss Universe 2007 contestants